Cham ol Obeyd (also Romanized as Cham ol 'Obeyd and Chamm ol 'Obeyd; also known as Chammolābād and Ḩamlābād) is a village in Anaqcheh Rural District, in the Central District of Ahvaz County, Khuzestan Province, Iran. At the 2006 census, its population was 585, in 105 families.

References 

Populated places in Ahvaz County